Robert Benedict Browder (born December 11, 1962) is an American actor, writer and film director, known for his roles as John Crichton in Farscape and Cameron Mitchell in Stargate SG-1.

Early life
Born in Memphis, Tennessee, Browder grew up in Charlotte, North Carolina. His parents were race car owners and operators. He attended Furman University in Greenville, South Carolina and graduated with a degree in psychology. He was a star player on the Furman football team. Browder met his wife, actress Francesca Buller, while studying at the Central School of Speech and Drama in London.

Career
Browder appeared as a recurring guest on the U.S. television show Party of Five as Sam Brody in its 3rd season in 1997. Browder and Buller moved with their two children to Australia during the production of Farscape (1999–2003), on which Browder starred as American astronaut John Crichton.  Buller played several guest roles on the show. The two returned to the United States in 2003 following the cancellation of Farscape. He has received two Saturn Awards for Best Actor in a Television Role for his acting in Farscape. He appeared in the 2004 movie A Killer Within, co-starring C. Thomas Howell and Sean Young. Also in 2004, he portrayed fellow actor Lee Majors in the made-for-TV film Behind the Camera: The Unauthorized Story of Charlie's Angels.

He returned to play John Crichton in the 2004 SciFi Channel mini-series Farscape: The Peacekeeper Wars. The mini-series wrapped up the remaining plotlines of Farscape, while leaving open the possibility of future adventures.

October 2003 marked the audiobook release of Interlopers, a novel written by Alan Dean Foster and narrated by Browder.

In January 2005, Browder voiced the character Bartholomew Aloysius "Bat" Lash in an episode of the animated series Justice League Unlimited entitled "The Once and Future Thing, Part 1: Weird Western Tales".

Browder returned to the SciFi Channel as he joined the cast of Stargate SG-1 for its ninth season in 2005. He played the character of Lieutenant Colonel Cameron Mitchell, the new commanding officer of SG-1.  Browder's former Farscape co-star Claudia Black appeared on SG-1 in the eighth-season episode entitled "Prometheus Unbound" and again during the first episodes of the ninth season before becoming a regular cast member on the series at the beginning of its tenth season in 2006. Several episodes of Stargate SG-1, most notably "200", comically alluded to Farscape during Browder and Black's time on the series. In addition to being a series regular on Stargate SG-1, Browder also performed many of his own stunts.

In 2012, Browder was cast in a series 7 episode of Doctor Who, "A Town Called Mercy". It was filmed in Almeria, Spain, in March 2012.

Browder played the role of Max the Janitor in the 2012 live-action feature film Bad Kids Go to Hell, based on the graphic novel of the same name. He reprised the role and made his directorial debut in the 2017 sequel Bad Kids of Crestview Academy.

Filmography

Film

Television

Video game

Awards
 2000 – Nominated for the Saturn Award for Best Genre TV Actor for Farscape
 2001 – Nominated for the Saturn Award for Best Actor on Television for Farscape
 2002 – Won the Saturn Award for Best Actor in a Television Series for Farscape
 2003 – Nominated for the Saturn Award for Best Actor in a Television Series for Farscape
 2004 – Won the Saturn Award for Best Actor on Television for Farscape: The Peacekeeper Wars
 2005 – Nominated for the Saturn Award for Best Actor on Television for Stargate SG-1

References

External links

 
 

1962 births
Alumni of the Royal Central School of Speech and Drama
American male film actors
American male television actors
American male voice actors
Furman University alumni
Living people
Male actors from Charlotte, North Carolina
Male actors from Los Angeles